Luis Heitor-Piffer (born 17 November 1988) is a Brazilian professional footballer who last played as a defender for Minnesota United FC in the North American Soccer League.

Career

Early career
Born in Amparo in Brazil, Piffer played for two seasons at the Grand View University for the Grand View Vikings soccer team. During his two seasons with Grand View scored 22 goals and won two Midwest Collegiate Conference’s Player of the Year honors.

Minnesota United
On April 19, 2013 it was announced that Piffer had signed with Minnesota United FC of the North American Soccer League. He then made his professional debut for the club on June 1, 2013 against the San Antonio Scorpions. He came on as a 70th-minute substitute for Kentaro Takada as United lost 2–0.

He then had his contract option declined by Minnesota United on December 3, 2013.

Career statistics

References

1988 births
Living people
Brazilian footballers
Brazilian expatriate footballers
Des Moines Menace players
Minnesota United FC (2010–2016) players
Association football defenders
USL League Two players
North American Soccer League players
Expatriate soccer players in the United States
People from Amparo, São Paulo